Amphitorna albipuncta is a moth in the family Drepanidae. It was described by George Hampson in 1893. It is found in Sri Lanka.

Description
The wingspan is about 26 mm. Male with thickened antennae and flattened by the coalescing of the serrations. Adults are ochraceous chestnut, with numerous black strigae, the forewings with an indistinct medial inwardly-oblique darker band and a white spot at the end of the cell. There is a postmedial band with a pale outer edge, angled below the costa, as well as an indistinct subapical dusky patch. The hindwings have a pale costal area and a medial oblique pale-edged band continuous with the postmedial band of the forewings, and not continued across the pale costal area.

References

Moths described in 1893
Drepaninae
Moths of Sri Lanka